The 2016 Porsche GT3 Cup Challenge Australia is the 26th running. Ryan Simpson is the defending champion.

Team and drivers

All A class teams used Porsche 911 GT3 Cup Type 997 (MY2010-2012) all B class team used Porsche 911 GT3 Cup Type 997 (MY2006-2009). They all used Pirelli Tyres.

Race calendar
The series is being contested over eight rounds with rounds 3 & 4 being part of the Jim Richards Endurance Trophy.

Series standings

See also
2016 Porsche Carrera Cup Australia

References

External links
 

2016 in Australian motorsport
Porsche GT3 Cup Challenge Australia